Isidro Ayora (formerly known as Soledad) is a town located in central Guayas, Ecuador. It is named after Isidro Ayora, a former Ecuadorian president. It is the seat of the canton of Isidro Ayora, the newest canton in the province, created in 1996.

At the 2001 census there were 8,826 people living within canton limits. The main crops are rice, maize, mango, and watermelon.

Populated places in Guayas Province